Kenneth Lee Butler (born August 3, 1948) is an American artist and musician, as well as an experimental musical instrument builder. His Hybrid musical instruments and other artworks explore the interaction and transformation of common and uncommon objects, altered images, sounds and silence. The idea of bricolage, essentially using whatever is "at hand", is at the center of his art, encompassing a wide range of practice that combines live music, instrument design, performance art, theater, sculpture, installation, photography, film/video, graphic design, drawing, and collage.

He is internationally recognized as an innovator of experimental musical instruments created from diverse materials including tools, sports equipment, and household objects.

His works have been exhibited and performed in galleries, clubs, museums, festivals, and theatres throughout the USA, Canada, and Europe including The Stedelijk Museum in Amsterdam and Lincoln Center and The Metropolitan Museum of Art in New York City as well as in South America and Japan.

Early life
Butler studied viola as a child and maintained a strong interest in music while studying the visual arts at Colorado College and in France at The Institute for American Universities in Aix-en-Provence, completing his MFA in painting from Portland State University in 1977. He moved to New York City in 1988 from Portland, Oregon.

Collaborations
In the past and currently Butler has worked with artists like John Zorn, Laurie Anderson, Butch Morris, The Soldier String Quartet. Butler has released an album on John Zorn's label Tzadik Records, and performed in many places including the Knitting Factory.

Media appearances
His works have been reviewed in The New York Times, The Village Voice, Artforum, Smithsonian, and Sculpture Magazine and have been featured on PBS, CNN, MTV, and NBC, including a live appearance on The Tonight Show.

Discography
 Ken Butler, Voices of Anxious Objects, (CD with 16-page color booklet.) Tzadik Records, TZ 7402, 1997.
 Live at Zebulon 2005, CD, Hybrid Visions Music, 2006
 KB's Greatest Hits 1993-1996, CD, Hybrid Visions Music, 2005
 Live at Kerrytown Concert Hall, (trio w. vocals) CD, Hybrid Visions Music, 2005
 This is It: Live at Zebulon Volume 1, includes "Par Twelve", CD, Zebulon, 2005
 Out of Nowhere, Judith Ren-Lay, CD, Knitting Factory Records, 2003.
 Improsculpt, Collaboration with Oeyvind Brandtsegg, http://teks.no/oeyvind, 2002
 Gravikords, Whirlies & Pyrophones: Experimental Musical Instruments, CD, with 96-page booklet and CD, Ellipsis Arts, CD 3530, 1996.
 An Artist in The Civilized World, Ric Soshin, CD, Phantom Records 4321, 1996.
 Testament: Conduction #23, Lawrence D. Butch Morris, CD, New World Records, 80482-2, 1995.
 AS IS, Loretta Roome, Eric Feinstein, (guitar tracks), for self-produced cassette, Brooklyn, NY, 1994.
 Experimental Musical Instruments, Nicasio, Ca., From the Pages, cassette Volume III, 1988, and Volume VIII, 1993.
 Improvisations, Ken Butler and Dina Emerson, Gargoyle Mechanique, New York, sampler cassette, 1990.

Film and video production
 Hybrid Visions, (2-hr. DVD of excerpts 1993-2006), Hybrid Visions Music, 2006
 "Hand Song", 16 mm  animated film selected for Ann Arbor Film Festival, 1974.
 "Hybrid Antics", video produced at Rogers Cablesystems, Portland, Ore, 1984.
 Art Directed Gus Van Sant's first film "Mala Noche", Portland, 1986.

Career highlights
 2008	Pollock/Krasner Foundation Grant, The Dayton Art Institute Ohio, Compiegne Library, France
 2007	Art Gym at Marylhurst Univ, Hallie Ford Museum, Elizabeth Leach Gallery, artMoving Projects
 2006	Mass MoCA, Sideshow Gallery, The Lab, Light in Winter Festival
 2005	Lancaster Museum Pa, The Avampato Museum NC, Dowd Fine Arts Center, NY
 2004	De Paul Univ. Chicago, Michigan Theatre, 2B Gallery Budapest, Kerrytown Concert Hall MI
 2003	Collective Unconscious, The Knitting Factory, NYC
 2002	The Aldrich Museum, CT., F. Donald Kenney Museum NY, (color catalog),
 2001	The Klanghaus  Hamburg, Rose Art Museum Brandeis, Paris, Radio Bremen.
 2000	Exit Art, Florence Lynch Gallery, The Boston Museum, BAM Cafe, The Kitchen
 1999 	NYFA  Fellowship, The Brooklyn Museum, Smithsonian  Magazine, The Tonight Show .
 1998	Wintergarden Theater, Citicorp Atrium, Met Life Windows NYC.
 1997	Metropolitan Museum of Art, Art Gallery of Ontario, Oakland Museum, Knitting Factory, CD on Tzadik.
 1996	The Kitchen, The Metropolitan Museum of Art, Soho Festival NYC, Portland Center for the Performing Arts. 	
 1995	Lincoln Center, Thread Waxing Space, Experimental Intermedia, NYC, Maryland Institute of the Arts.
 1994	Printemps de Bourges and Art Rock St. Brieuc Festivals, France, Podewil  Berlin, Cave 12 Geneva, Whitney Museum NYC.
 1993	NY Foundation for the Arts Fellowship, Exit Art, Thread Waxing Space, Performing Garage, The Drawing Center, Roulette, NYC, Images du Futur, Montreal.
 1992	Test-Site Gallery, Generator, NYC., Portland Center for the Performing Arts, Gallery Nishiasabu, Tokyo.
 1991	Metropolitan Museum of Art, Great Hall at Cooper Union, NYC,  Music-Action Festival, France, ICPNA, LIma, Peru, Jamison Thomas Gallery, Portland.
 1990	Stedelijk Museum Amsterdam, New Music America Montreal, Roulette  NYC.
 1989	NEA  InterArts grant, The Apollohouse Eindhoven  the Netherlands, The Virginia Museum of Fine Arts, The Painted Bride Art Center in Philadelphia.
 1988	The Kitchen NYC, New Music America  Miami, NW Artists Workshop, Portland.
 1987	Franklin Furnace, The Knitting Factory, NYC, Portland Center for the Visual Arts, New Langton Arts Multidisciplinary  Project Grant.
 1986	The Art Gym, Portland, On the Boards, Bumbershoot Festival, Seattle, Dance Studio, LA.
 1985	On the Boards, Seattle, The House, Santa Monica, CA.
 1984	Littman Gallery, NW Artists Workshop, Portland.
 1983	NEA Artist Fellowship, Oregon Arts Commission Fellowship, Portland Art Museum, Portland Center for the Visual Arts.
 1982	Elizabeth Leach Gallery, NW Artists Workshop, Portland, Rosco Louie Gallery, Seattle

References

External links
Official website
[ Ken Butler] on allmusic.com
Ken Butler on oddmusic.com
List of media and tv appearances

Living people
American experimental musicians
Inventors of musical instruments
American luthiers
Tzadik Records artists
Portland State University alumni
Musicians from Portland, Oregon
1948 births